Lipoatrophia semicircularis is a medical condition in humans, commonly known as ribbed thighs.

It consists of a semicircular zone of atrophy of the subcutaneous fatty tissue located mostly on the front of the thighs. Skin and underlying muscles remains intact. 

Semicircular lipoatrophy mainly affects office workers. The ribs in the thighs are typically between 2 and 4 cm high and are typically located at about 72 cm above the ground, which is the standard height of office furniture.

Cause
It is not yet clear what exactly causes semicircular lipoatrophy. Some hypotheses are that it is caused by localized pressure or by electromagnetic fields.

Diagnosis

Treatment

See also 
 Lipodystrophy
 List of cutaneous conditions

References

External links 

Conditions of the subcutaneous fat